Motasingha is a genus of skipper butterflies in the family Hesperiidae.

Species
Motasingha dirphia Hewitson, 1868
Motasingha trimaculata Tepper, 1882

References

Natural History Museum Lepidoptera genus database
Motasingha at funet

Hesperiidae genera
Trapezitinae